The Dutch Super Sprint Championships of speed skating, organised by the KNSB, is the official Dutch championship to determine the Dutch Super Sprint champion. The Sprint distance championships date back to 1991 for men and 1992 for women.

Usually two distances are skated twice, the 100m and the 300m. The championships were created as a modern substitute in indoor skating rinks for the more traditional straight track form used in Kortebaanschaatsen tournaments over a distance of 140 and 160 meters, which are only available in winter on city canals. In 2013 and 2014 a new format called 'Pure Sprint' was introduced where competitors skate the 100, 300, and 500 meters once each.

Men's super sprint

Source: www.schaatsen.nl

Women's super sprint

Source: www.schaatsen.nl

References

Dutch Speed Skating Championships
Speed skating in the Netherlands